FASTON terminals are connectors that are widely used in electronic and electrical equipment. These terminals are manufactured by many companies, commonly using the term "quick disconnect", "tab" terminals, or blade connectors.

The terminals are often called "quick disconnect" because the predecessors were screw terminals, which took longer to disconnect. The name "tab" terminals is a description of the shape of the male terminal.

Six series are available, named after their blade width in inches. Insulated versions of the terminals are color-coded to indicate what wire gauges they may be used with. The terminal system consists of tabs (male) and receptacles (female). There are free-hanging wire and circuit board mounted versions of both tabs and receptacles.

A little-known hand tool exists for inserting the terminals, the AMP Universal Handle.

They have been commonly used since the 1970s.  Faston is a trademark.

Specifications
 PIDG FASTON (Nylon) terminals are defined in AMP Specification 114-1002: Terminal, FASTON, PIDG, Application of
 PLASTI-GRIP (Vinyl) (insulation restricting) terminals are defined in AMP Specification 114-1003: Terminal, FASTON, PLASTI-GRIP, Application of
 UL 310 "Standard for Electrical Quick--Connect Terminals"
 CSA 22.2 #153, “Quick--Connect Terminals”
 UL 486 also specifies the testing of standard wire connectors and soldering lugs.
 MIL-T-7928

Crimp styles
Four main styles of crimps are specified by AMP:
 "F" Crimp for use on non-insulated connectors
 TETRA-CRIMP for use on insulated PIDG and PLASTI-GRIP connectors
 "C" Crimp, typically used for flag connectors (where the wire enters the connector perpendicular to the direction of tab insertion)
 Tab-Lok, typically used for flag connectors

Wire gauge insulation colors

The colors don't provide information about the polarity of the crimped cables but specify their diameter.

Sizes and ratings

375 series 
0.375-inch (9.5 mm) male tab width
 10mm2, 50A (continuous)

312 series 
0.312-inch (7.92 mm) male tab width
 4-6mm2, 28A (continuous)
 2.5mm2, 14A (continuous)
 1.5mm2, 10A (continuous)
 1.0mm2, 8A (continuous)
 0.75mm2, 7A (continuous)

250 series 
0.250-inch (6.35 mm) male tab width
 10 AWG, 24 amps (continuous)
 12 AWG, 20 amps (continuous)
 14 AWG, 15 amps (continuous)
 16 AWG, 10 amps (continuous)
 18 AWG, 7 amps (continuous)
 20 AWG, 4 amps (continuous)
 22 AWG, 3 amps (continuous)

205 series 
0.205-inch (5.21 mm) male tab width
 14 AWG, 15 amps (continuous)
 16 AWG, 10 amps (continuous)
 18 AWG, 7 amps (continuous)
 20 AWG, 4 amps (continuous)
 22 AWG, 3 amps (continuous)

187 series 
0.187-inch (4.75 mm) male tab width
 16 AWG, 10 amps (continuous)
 18 AWG, 7 amps (continuous)
 20 AWG, 4 amps (continuous)
 22 AWG, 3 amps (continuous)

125 series 
0.125-inch (3.18 mm) male tab width

110 series 
0.110-inch (2.79 mm) male tab width
 16 AWG, 5 amps (continuous)
 18 AWG, 4 amps (continuous)
 20 AWG, 3 amps (continuous)
 22 AWG, 2 amps (continuous)

References

External links
 te.com FASTON, PIDG, AMP and PLASTI-GRIP are trademarks
 Stocko-Contact.com

Electrical power connectors